Big Hands may refer to 
Gary "Big Hands" Johnson, American football player
Brian O'Connor (bassist)